Paraber Peak (6,322m / 20,741 ft) is a peak in Stak Valley of Gilgit-Baltistan. This mountain is located in the Karakoram range and the prominent landmarks in the vicinity are Haramosh Peak, Laila Peak, Kutia Lungma Glacier and the Chogo Lungma Glacier.

References 

Six-thousanders of the Karakoram
Mountains of Gilgit-Baltistan